One Sonic Society is a contemporary worship music collective from around the globe. That collective is composed of songwriter Jason Ingram on vocals, guitar and piano, Delirious? lead guitarist Stuart Garrard on guitar and vocals, Hillsong UNITED drummer Paul Mabury on drums and programming, Jonathan Thatcher bass guitarist from Delirious? on bass and synths. The Christian music collective released their debut studio album under the Essential Records label on 28 February 2012 called Forever Reign. Their single "Forever Reign" was put in rotation during 2011 by many US radio stations.

Background
Jason Ingram, Stuart Garrard, Paul Mabury and Jonathan Thatcher formed the Christian Music collective in 2009. The band was formed in 2009 at the end of Delirious?, which Stu G sought out Christian artist to work with in Nashville at the time that is when he met up with Ingram. After they saw how the group would work together they added in Mabury, an Ingram connection, and Thatcher a Stu G add from his former band Delirious?. The One aspect of their name came from "just the vision of the four of us being together in unity", which the "Sonic being sound and wanting to keep creating and pushing forward with that", and Society is "that it's not just us but a community."

Music

Releases
The band made three EPs in 2010 and 2011 with the titles of One, Sonic, Society, which was the precursor to their full length effort Forever Reign, and all of the four were released on the Essential Records label. The song that Stu G cited as favourite track is "Now and Forever", which is because he loved "the theme of grace and that God loves us as we are and that 'my sin has gone like it has not been'. That came from reading Meister Eckhart a German vicar from the 12th century." The song Ingram would want to be remembered by is "Burn", which was a song written by Paul Mabury, and that is because "It goes 'Lord write me into Your great story, Lord write me into Your great song, take all I have its for Your glory, one day all else will be gone." However, Both of them cite "Forever Reign" and "Greatness of Our God" as songs that they love.

Following the release of Forever Reign, they produced Live at the Tracking Room, on 13 July 2012.

Radio
Their charted single "Forever Reign" has been put in rotation over the last year by many radio stations.

Discography

Album

Live albums

EPs

One (2010)
Sonic (2010)
Society (2011)
Make a Way (2015)

Singles

Compilation appearances

 WOW Worship: Purple, 2010: "Forever Reign" (album version)
 WOW Hits 2018, 2017: "Great Are You Lord"

References

External links
 
 Louder Than The Music Profile
 allmusic Album Information

American Christian musical groups
Essential Records (Christian) artists
Musical groups established in 2009